The 1998–99 English football season was Derby County F.C.'s third consecutive season in the Premier League.

Season summary
Derby's second tilt at European football was made in the 1998–99 season, the Rams peaking in 2nd place after 6 games with a 2–0 home win over Leicester City, eventually finishing one place better off in 8th. They reached the FA Cup Quarter finals for the third time in seven years, losing out only to late Nwankwo Kanu goal in a 0–1 away defeat to Arsenal, and recorded some memorable victories, including a league double over Liverpool 2–1 at Anfield and 3–2 at Pride Park and a 1–0 win over Nottingham Forest in the teams' first ever meeting at Pride Park. Derby County were a club on the up; Pride Park's capacity was expanded (32,913 fans attended the 3–2 victory over Liverpool) and Derby's players were getting noticed – five had represented their countries at the 1998 World Cup, and Christian Dailly was sold to Blackburn Rovers for £5.35m, comfortably the highest fee Derby had ever received. The key departure, however, was Steve McClaren – Smith's number two since he had taken the Derby managerial position 3 years earlier – who departed in February 1999 to become Sir Alex Ferguson's assistant at Manchester United, winning the treble in his first 3 months at Old Trafford. The 1998–99 season was Jim Smith's Derby County peak, as the financial demands of Premier League football began to catch up with them.

Final league table

Results summary

Results by round

Results
Derby County's score comes first

Legend

FA Premier League

FA Cup

League Cup

Players

First-team squad
Squad at end of season

Left club during season

Reserve squad

Transfers

In

Out

Transfers in:  £5,350,000
Transfers out:  £10,825,000
Total spending:  £5,475,000

Statistics

Appearances, goals and cards
(Starting appearances + substitute appearances)

Starting 11
Considering starts in all competitions
 GK: #1,  Russell Hoult, 26
 RB: #3,  Stefan Schnoor, 25
 CB: #17,  Spencer Prior, 39
 CB: #2,  Horacio Carbonari, 32
 LB: #16,  Jacob Laursen, 44
 CM: #18,  Lee Carsley, 27
 CM: #4,  Darryl Powell, 34
 CM: #14,  Lars Bohinen, 32
 RF: #20,  Stefano Eranio, 24 (Rory Delap has 24 starts as a right midfielder)
 CF: #8,  Dean Sturridge, 30
 LF: #9,  Paulo Wanchope, 37

Notes

References

Derby County F.C. seasons
Derby County